Stara Pazova is a town and municipality located in the Srem District of the autonomous province of Vojvodina, Serbia. The town has a population of 64,792, while Stara Pazova municipality has 65,792 inhabitants. The entrance into town from Inđija lies on 45th parallel north, it is half-way between the North pole and the equator.

Name
In Serbian, the town is known as Stara Pazova (Стара Пазова), formerly also Pazova (Пазова); in Slovak as Stará Pazova; in German as Alt-Pasua, Alt-Pazua or Pazua; and in Hungarian as Ópazova.

History
During the Ottoman administration (16th-18th century), Pazova was populated by ethnic Serbs and was part of the Ottoman Sanjak of Syrmia. In 1718, the town became part of the Habsburg monarchy. In the 18th century (after 1760) Lutheran Slovaks settled in Pazova, and in 1791 Germans arrived here as well. The Germans lived in a separate settlement known as Nova Pazova ("New Pazova"), thus the old settlement was named Stara Pazova ("Old Pazova"). Until the second half of the 20th century, Slovaks were the  largest ethnic group in the town of Stara Pazova, while the largest ethnic group in the surrounding municipality were Serbs.

For most part of the Habsburg rule, Stara Pazova was part of the Habsburg Military Frontier (abolished in 1882), while in 1848-1849 it was part of Serbian Vojvodina. In the late 19th and early 20th century, Stara Pazova was a district centre in the Syrmia County (part of the Kingdom of Croatia-Slavonia, Kingdom of Hungary and Austria-Hungary). According to the 1910 census, the population of the Stara Pazova municipality numbered 46,430 inhabitants, of whom 24,262 spoke Serbian, 9,348 German, 5,779 Slovak, and 5,670 Croatian.  The town itself had a Slovak majority in 1910.

After 1918, the town was part of the Kingdom of Serbs, Croats and Slovenes and subsequent South Slavic states.

Inhabited places

Stara Pazova municipality includes the town of Stara Pazova and the following settlements:

Belegiš
Vojka
Golubinci
Krnješevci
Nova Pazova
Novi Banovci
Stari Banovci
Surduk

Demographics

According to the 2011 census results, the municipality of Stara Pazova has a population of 65,792 inhabitants.

Ethnic groups
All settlements in the municipality have an ethnic Serb majority. The ethnic composition of the municipality:

Economy
The following table gives a preview of total number of registered people employed in legal entities per their core activity (as of 2018):

Gallery

International relations

Twin towns — Sister cities
Stara Pazova is twinned with:
 Srebrenica, Bosnia and Herzegovina

See also
 List of places in Serbia
 List of cities, towns and villages in Vojvodina

References

Slobodan Ćurčić, Broj stanovnika Vojvodine, Novi Sad, 1996.
Dr. Dušan J. Popović, Srbi u Vojvodini, knjiga 1, Novi Sad, 1990.
Borislav Jankulov, Pregled kolonizacije Vojvodine u XVIII i XIX veku, Novi Sad - Pančevo, 2003.
Dr. Branislav Bukurov, Bačka, Banat i Srem, Novi Sad, 1978.

External links

 
 Radio and TV station Stara Pazova 

 
Populated places in Srem District
Populated places in Syrmia
Municipalities and cities of Vojvodina
Towns in Serbia